Lake Dardanelle is a major reservoir on the Arkansas River in Arkansas, USA. and is an integral part of the McClellan-Kerr Arkansas River Navigation System (MKARNS), which allows barge transportation from the Mississippi River to the Tulsa Port of Catoosa in northeastern Oklahoma. MKARNS went into service along its full length in 1971.

Lake description

Lake Dardanelle, a reservoir on the Arkansas River, provides many recreational opportunities. The lake extends from Dardanelle Lock and Dam near Dardanelle, into Pope, Yell, Logan, Johnson and Franklin Counties. Each recreational park on Dardanelle has drinking water, picnic tables and toilet facilities. Most have trailer dump stations, boat launch ramps and electrical sites.

The only nuclear power plant in Arkansas, Arkansas Nuclear One, is located on the northeastern shore of Lake Dardanelle.

Mount Nebo (Arkansas) is close to the area and provides scenic views for visitors along the lake. The Ozark and Ouachita Mountains also offer great scenery and have mountain springs and recreation parks in abundance. The mountains of the Ozarks and Ouachitas are abundant in wildlife. The bald eagle often uses this area for wintering. Eagles can be seen here from late fall to early spring.

Lake Dardanelle State Park is located on two sites, one in Russellville and the other, across the lake to the south, near Dardanelle. The Russellville park includes a visitor center with aquariums and natural and cultural history displays, a fishing pier, and a fishing tournament weigh-in pavilion that is used for the many fishing tournaments held on the lake. Both sites offer campsites, boat launch ramps, standard pavilions, picnic sites, playgrounds and bathhouses.

See also 
List of Arkansas dams and reservoirs

References

External links
 Lake Dardanelle - official site at U.S. Army Corps of Engineers

Protected areas of Franklin County, Arkansas
Protected areas of Johnson County, Arkansas
Protected areas of Logan County, Arkansas
Protected areas of Pope County, Arkansas
Dardanelle
Dardanelle
Protected areas of Yell County, Arkansas
Buildings and structures in Franklin County, Arkansas
Buildings and structures in Johnson County, Arkansas
Buildings and structures in Logan County, Arkansas
Buildings and structures in Pope County, Arkansas
Buildings and structures in Yell County, Arkansas
Bodies of water of Franklin County, Arkansas
Bodies of water of Johnson County, Arkansas
Bodies of water of Logan County, Arkansas
Bodies of water of Pope County, Arkansas
Infrastructure completed in 1971